The Men's 10 kilometre sprint biathlon competition at the 2006 Winter Olympics in Turin, Italy was held on 14 February, at Cesana San Sicario. Competitors raced over three loops of the 3.3 kilometre skiing course, shooting ten times, five prone and five standing. Each miss required a competitor to ski a 150-metre penalty loop.

Ole Einar Bjørndalen of Norway was the defending World and Olympic champion, but Germany's Michael Greis led the World Cup standings before the Torino Games, with three more Germans in the top six.

Results 

Two Austrian athletes were disqualified after the IOC determined they had violated the Anti-Doping rules; Wolfgang Rottmann had originally placed 27th, while Wolfgang Perner had placed 4th.

The race was held at 13:30.

References

Men's biathlon at the 2006 Winter Olympics